Margarita of Spain (25 May 1610-11 March 1617) was an infanta of Spain, who died in childhood.

Life 
She was the seventh child of the marriage composed of Philip III and Margaret of Austria and the fourth of their daughters, after Ana, María and María Ana.

She was born in Lerma, capital of the states of the valido of her father, the Duke of Lerma, who was still in his privilege. On 10 June 1610, on the feast of Corpus Christi, she was baptized in the Valladolid cathedral by the archbishop of Toledo, Bernardo de Sandoval. Her godparents were her older sister, the Infanta Ana Mauricia and the Duke of Lerma himself. In honor of this last godfather, she received Francisca as a middle name. She was carried to the baptismal font by her baptismal godfather.

At the age of six she could already read and write and read the catechism. She was fond of pious practices.

She died in the Alcazar of Madrid at the age of 6 years. She was taken with the usual pomp to the monastery of San Lorenzo de El Escorial. She is buried in the ninth chamber of the Panteón of Infantes, under the following epitaph:Non moriar sed vivam et narrabo opera Domini (Sal 117, 17)

Notes

References 

Spanish infantas
1610 births
1617 deaths
Portuguese infantas
House of Habsburg
Burials in the Pantheon of Infantes at El Escorial
Royalty and nobility who died as children
Daughters of kings